Mark Arendz  (born March 3, 1990) is a Canadian biathlon and Para-Nordic skier. He was disabled at the age of seven when his arm got caught in the blades of a grain auger. He participated in the 2010, 2014 and 2018 Winter Paralympics and won 8 medals in total, including gold in the men's 15km biathlon standing at the 2018 games.

Early life
Arendz was born on 3 March 1990 in Charlottetown, Prince Edward Island. At the age of seven, he lost his left arm when he lost his balance putting corn into a grain auger. His arm up to his shoulder was caught in the blades and later amputated in Halifax. After the accident, he worked as a junior counselor for the War Amps organization. He also went to Nicaragua with the non-profit organization SchoolBOX to help build a school for the community who had to move.

Career
At his first Paralympics in Vancouver 2010, Arendz participated in six races but did not medal.

During the 2014 Winter Paralympics, he received silver and bronze medals for the 7.5 kilometres standing and the 12.5 kilometres standing respectively. Arendz entered the 7.5 km standing biathlon as the defending champion. He came second in the event, seven tenths of a second behind gold medalist Vladislav Lekomtcev of Russia. Azat Karachurin, also from Russia, took bronze in the event. The weather conditions were not good as it rained with heavy fog for the 12.5 kilometre race. Arendz finished the race in 30:24:6 while the defending world champion Azat Karachurin of Russia took gold again. Arendz became the first Canadian to win two biathlon medals at the Winter Paralympics. After the games, his former ski club, Brookvale Nordic Ski Centre, renamed a ski trail in Brookvale, P.E.I after him, boasting this is where he trained. Arendz hopes the new ski trail will encourage more people to give biathlon and cross country skiing a try.

At the 2018 Winter Paralympics in Pyeongchang, South Korea Arendz won a Canadian single Games record 6 medals, 5 individual and a team relay medal, including biathlon gold, silver and bronze and his first cross-country medals, and was honoured as Canada's flag-bearer for the Games closing ceremony.

He won the bronze medal in the men's 6 kilometres standing event at the 2022 Winter Paralympics held in Beijing, China.

References

External links 
 
 

1990 births
Biathletes at the 2010 Winter Paralympics
Biathletes at the 2014 Winter Paralympics
Biathletes at the 2018 Winter Paralympics
Biathletes at the 2022 Winter Paralympics
Canadian male biathletes
Canadian male cross-country skiers
Cross-country skiers at the 2010 Winter Paralympics
Cross-country skiers at the 2014 Winter Paralympics
Cross-country skiers at the 2018 Winter Paralympics
Cross-country skiers at the 2022 Winter Paralympics
Living people
Medalists at the 2014 Winter Paralympics
Medalists at the 2018 Winter Paralympics
Medalists at the 2022 Winter Paralympics
Paralympic biathletes of Canada
Paralympic cross-country skiers of Canada
Paralympic gold medalists for Canada
Paralympic silver medalists for Canada
Paralympic bronze medalists for Canada
Sportspeople from Charlottetown
Paralympic medalists in cross-country skiing
Paralympic medalists in biathlon